The 2008 North American Under 21 World Qualifier speedway event took place on August 29 in Auburn, California. The two qualifiers were Ricky Wells and Kenny Ingalls.

Results

2008
North American Under 21 World Qualifier, 2008
North American Under 21 World Qualifier
Speed